Short track speed skating at the 1998 Winter Olympics was held from 17 to 21 February. Six events were contested at the White Ring.

Medal summary

Medal table

South Korea led the medal table with six, including three golds. Chun Lee-kyung led the individual medal table, with two golds and one bronze. The top men's medalist was Kim Dong-sung, who won one gold and one silver.

Men's events

Women's events

Participating NOCs
Eighteen nations competed in the short track events at Nagano. Belarus, the Germany, Poland and Ukraine made their short track debuts.

References

 
1998 Winter Olympics events
1998
1998 in short track speed skating